China National Erzhong Group is a Chinese state-owned heavy machinery company, which makes smelting and forging equipment, with its headquarters in Deyang, Sichuan. In 2015, it defaulted on interest payments after a local court accepted a restructuring request from one of its creditors.

As of 2008, it had 12,650 employees.

References

External links

Government-owned companies of China
Manufacturing companies of China
Companies based in Sichuan
Chinese brands